Canthydrus festivus is a species of burrowing water beetle in the family Noteridae. It is found in North America.

References 

Noteridae
Beetles described in 1888